International Territorial Level (ITL) is a geocode standard for referencing the subdivisions of the United Kingdom for statistical purposes, used by the Office for National Statistics (ONS). Between 2003 and 2021, as part of the European Union and European Statistical System, the geocode standard used for the United Kingdom were Nomenclature of Territorial Units for Statistics or NUTS. The NUTS code for the UK was UK and the NUTS standard had a hierarchy of three levels, with 12 first level regions, which are currently mirrored by the ITL classification, of which 9 regions are in England. The sub-structure corresponds to administrative divisions within the country. Formerly, the further NUTS divisions IV and V existed; these have now been replaced by Local Administrative Units (LAU-1 and LAU-2 respectively).
Between 1994 and 2011, the nine regions had an administrative role in the implementation of UK Government policy, and as the areas covered by (mostly indirectly) elected bodies.

List of regions
The ITL 1 statistical regions correspond with the regions of England as used by the UK's Office for National Statistics. Prior to 2021, all codes had "UK" instead of "TL" for Territorial Level.
TLC. North East (used in NUTS as UKC)
TLD. North West (used in NUTS as UKD)
TLE. Yorkshire and the Humber (used in NUTS as UKE)
TLF. East Midlands (used in NUTS as UKF)
TLG. West Midlands (used in NUTS as UKG)
TLH. East of England (used in NUTS as UKH)
TLI. London (used in NUTS as UKI)
TLJ. South East (used in NUTS as UKJ)
TLK. South West (used in NUTS as UKK)

Greater London has a directly elected Mayor and Assembly. The other eight regions have Local authority leaders' boards, which have a role in coordinating local government on a regional level, with members appointed by local government bodies. These boards replaced indirectly elected regional assemblies, which were established in 1994 and undertook a range of co-ordinating, lobbying, scrutiny and strategic planning functions until their abolition.

Sub-structure of the regions

	 	
Each region of England is divided into a range of metropolitan and non-metropolitan counties. For ITL purposes, these subdivisions are formally known as ITL levels 2 and 3.
	 
 London region is divided into
 London boroughs (ITL 3, usual grouped)
 All other regions are divided into
 metropolitan counties (ITL 2)
 shire counties (ITL 2 or 3 depending on the region) and
 unitary authorities (usually ITL 3).

See also
 Regions of England
 Historical and alternative regions of England
 International Territorial Level
 List of articles about local government in the United Kingdom
 Nomenclature of Territorial Units for Statistics

References

External links 
Local Government Boundary Commission for England
Dept of Communities and Local Government

 
England
Regionalism (politics) in the United Kingdom
Types of subdivision in the United Kingdom